This is a list of fellows of the Royal Society elected in 1908.

Fellows

Antoine Henri Becquerel  (1852–1908)
David James Hamilton  (1849–1909)
Silas Weir Mitchell  (1829–1914)
Friedrich Robert Helmert  (1843–1917)
William Gowland  (1842–1922)
William Halse Rivers Rivers  (1864–1922)
Charles Immanuel Forsyth Major  (1843–1923)
Arthur Dendy  (1865–1925)
H. H. Asquith (1852–1928)
Shibasaburo Kitasato  (1852–1931)
Sir Dugald Clerk
Otto Stapf
William Barlow
Edmund Neville Nevill
Herbrand Russell, 11th Duke of Bedford
Sir Jocelyn Field Thorpe
Randal Thomas Mowbray Rawdon Berkeley
John Stanley Gardiner  (1872–1946)
Henry Horatio Dixon
John Hilton Grace
Bertrand Russell

References

1908
1908 in the United Kingdom
1908 in science